The 2011–12 Northwestern Wildcats men's basketball team represented Northwestern University in the 2011–12 college basketball season. This was head coach Bill Carmody's twelfth season at the Northwestern. The Wildcats were members of the Big Ten Conference and played their home games at Welsh-Ryan Arena. They finished the season with 19-14 overall, 8-10 in Big Ten play, finished in a tie with Iowa in 7th place. The team concluded the postseason for the 2012 Big Ten Conference men's basketball tournament, where they were defeated by Minnesota in the first round. They were invited to the NIT, where they beat Akron in the first round, and they lost to Washington in the second round.

2011–12 Roster

Source:

Schedule and results
Source

|-
!colspan=9| Exhibition

|-
!colspan=9| Regular season

|-
!colspan=12| Big Ten tournament

|-
!colspan=9| National Invitation Tournament

References

Northwestern Wildcats
Northwestern Wildcats men's basketball seasons
Northwestern
Northwestern Wild
Northwestern Wild